Factitious diarrhea is a condition in which a person deliberately produces diarrhea, most commonly by surreptitious laxative abuse (laxative abuse syndrome).

These people tend to have persistent and unexplained watery diarrhea that is high in volume and frequency and, despite extensive evaluation, the cause may remain unknown. Many cases may mimic inflammatory bowel disease or malabsorption syndromes. Bowel movements are generally about 10 to 20 a day and may be especially associated with nocturnal movements. Factitious diarrhea is most often seen in people of high socioeconomic status and many are employed in the medical field.

Melanosis coli is a frequent find in long-standing factitious diarrhea. It demonstrates hyperpigmentation of the colon with white lymph nodes showing through on colonoscopy. An alternative means of diagnosis is by detecting pigment in macrophages of the lamina propria.

References 

Diarrhea
Factitious disorders